Sihle Sithole (born 24 November 1999), known professionally as Blxckie, is a South African rapper, songwriter and record producer from Sydenham Heights, Durban. His debut studio album B4Now (2021) was certified gold in South Africa.

Biography and career 
Sihle Sithole was born on 24 November 1999 in Sydenham Heights, Durban, South Africa. His musical interest started at the age of 8 when he recorded music with his friends. Sithole enrolled at the University of KwaZulu-Natal with a degree in Psychology, but failed to graduate due to the lockdown during the COVID-19 pandemic.

In an interview with Jade Kelly, he commented that he felt there was a disconnect between South African artists and their fans, saying "It's almost like when an artist blows up or gets a little bit of fame, that goes straight to their head. But what they forget is that the fans will always be the thing that stands between you and greatness. As much as they love the music, we need them to keep listening if we want to stick around, and that's what I'm all about."

In March 2020, Sithole visited Johannesburg and the country went on a 21-day lockdown while he was still there.

Early that same month, he was named Up Next artist by  Apple Music.

On 30 April 2021, his single "David" was released. The song was certified gold in South Africa.

On 10 May 2021, he announced a single "Ye ×4" featuring Nasty C and the release date via his Instagram account. The song was released 14 May 2021.

"Ye ×4" was certified double platinum with sales of over 40,000 units. 

His debut studio album B4Now was released on 21 May 2021. It features appearances from artists such as Nasty C, LucasRaps, FLVME, Rowlene, and LeoDaleo. The album was certified gold in South Africa with sales of over 10,000 units.

Blxckie embarked on B4Now Tour on 26 November kicking off in his home city of Durban at The Warehouse; that included 10 dates that ran through to December 2021. The tour was supported by mainstream talents such as A-Reece, Nasty C, Zakes Bantwini, Nadia Nakai, Sjava, Focalistic, Okmalumkoolkat, Big Zulu, as well as up and coming talents such as Shizze, LeoDaLeo, 031Choppa, Clout Internet Boyz and itsbambino. 

He won Freshman of the Year and was nominated for Album of the Year (B4Now), Song of the Year ("Ye ×4") and Best Collaboration at the South African Hip Hop Awards 2021. 

In December 2021, he ranked number 1 on MTV Base: SA's Hottest MCs.

"Cold" was released as his new EP's lead single on 3 February 2022, at the time of release he also announced the release date of his EP via his Instagram account.

On 18 February 2022, his EP 4LUV was released. He later collaborated with fellow South African rapper A-Reece on the song "Sneaky". 

He would then be nominated as the Best International Flow at the BET Hip Hop Awards in 2022.

Endorsement 
In May 2022, he was announced as the ambassador of clothing brand Redbat/Sportscenes.

Discography

Studio albums

Singles and EPs

As featured artist

Awards and nominations

BET UK Hip Hop Awards 

!
|-
| 2022
| Himself
| Best International Flow
| 
|

Clout Africa Awards 

!
|-
| 2022
| Himself 
| Songwriter of the Year
|
|

References

External links 
   

Living people
1999 births
South African rappers
South African hip hop musicians
South African record producers
South African songwriters
People from Durban
Musicians from Durban
21st-century South African musicians